John Barcellona is the Director of Woodwind Studies and Professor of Flute at CSULB and flutist with the internationally acclaimed Westwood Wind Quintet (recordings on Columbia, Crystal, and Western International Music).

Career
He is currently on the Board of Directors for the National Flute Association. His solo album, Is This The Way To Carnegie Hall (with Calvin Smith, horn) was nominated to the National Academy of Recording Arts and Sciences for a Grammy award.

Education
He received his B.M. from Hartt School of Music, his M.A. from CSULB and D.M.A. from USC. His principal teachers were Harold Bennett, Carl Bergner, Roger Stevens, and John Wummer.

External links
 http://www.csulb.edu/depts/music/woodwinds/john_barcellona.html
 http://www.producersinc.com/BandInfo.php?Band=christophercaliendo
 http://fsaf.org/artists.php?department=7
 http://www.christophercaliendo.com/index.php?option=com_content&task=view&id=435&Itemid=499

References

Year of birth missing (living people)
Living people
American flautists
University of Hartford alumni
USC Thornton School of Music alumni
California State University, Long Beach alumni
California State University, Long Beach faculty